Mike Posma (born December 16, 1967 in Medford, New Jersey) is an American former professional ice hockey player and former head coach. Posma was drafted by the St. Louis Blues in the 1986 NHL Entry Draft. He played professionally for the Utica Devils of the American Hockey League and later in Switzerland and Germany. He coached in Switzerland and Slovenia. With Slovenian club HDD Olimpija he got to the finals of EBEL league

Awards and honours

References

1967 births
Adler Mannheim players
ECH Chur players
HC Thurgau players
EHC Kloten players
Living people
People from Medford, New Jersey
SC Lyss players
St. Louis Blues draft picks
Utica Devils players
Western Michigan Broncos men's ice hockey players
American men's ice hockey defensemen
American expatriate ice hockey people
American expatriate sportspeople in Slovenia
American expatriate ice hockey players in Germany
American expatriate sportspeople in Switzerland
American expatriate ice hockey players in Switzerland
Expatriate ice hockey players in Germany
Ice hockey coaches from New Jersey
Ice hockey players from New Jersey
Sportspeople from Burlington County, New Jersey